Aref Haji Eydi (born April 6, 1999) is an Iranian footballer who plays as a defender who currently plays for Iranian club Saipa in the Persian Gulf Pro League.

Club career

Saipa
He made his debut for Saipa in 7th fixtures of 2019–20 Iran Pro League against Esteghlal.

References

Living people
1999 births
Association football defenders
Iranian footballers
Saipa F.C. players